State Road 35 is an IB-class road in southeastern Serbia and Kosovo, connecting Romania at HE Đerdap I with Albania at Vërmica.
Before the new road categorization regulation given in 2013, the route wore the following names: M 25, M 1.12, M 1, M 9 and M 2 (before 2012) / 14, A5 and A1 (after 2012).

The existing route is a main road with two traffic lanes. By the valid Space Plan of the Republic of Serbia, it's section of the road is not planned for upgrading to a motorway and is expected to be conditioned in its current state.

The road is a part of following European routes: E75, E80, E771 and E851.

Sections

See also 
 Roads in Serbia
 Roads in Kosovo

Notes

References

External links 
 Official website - Roads of Serbia (Putevi Srbije)
 Official website - Corridors of Serbia (Koridori Srbije) (Serbian)

State roads in Serbia